The yellow-browed melidectes (Melidectes rufocrissalis), also known as the yellow-browed honeyeater, is a species of bird in the family Meliphagidae. It is found mainly in Papua New Guinea.  Its natural habitat is subtropical or tropical moist montane forest.

References

External links
 Melidectes rufocrissalis on the Global Biodiversity Information Facility

yellow-browed melidectes
Birds of Papua New Guinea
yellow-browed melidectes
Taxonomy articles created by Polbot